Carlos Kefa Williams (born 26 June 1990) is a Liberian professional footballer who plays as a left-back for Liberian First Division club Watanga. He made one appearance for the Liberia national team in 2016.

References

External links 

 
 
1990 births
Living people
Sportspeople from Monrovia
Liberian footballers
Association football fullbacks
Monrovia Club Breweries players
Watanga FC players

Liberian First Division players
Liberia international footballers